The 2020 Seattle Mariners season was the 44th season in franchise history. The Mariners played their 21st full season (22nd overall) at T-Mobile Park, their home ballpark. The Mariners entered this season with the longest active playoff drought in the four major North American professional sports leagues, attempting to make their first postseason since 2001. They also entered this season as the only team to not win a league pennant.

On March 12, 2020, MLB announced that because of the ongoing COVID-19 pandemic, the start of the regular season would be delayed by at least two weeks in addition to the remainder of spring training being cancelled. Four days later, it was announced that the start of the season would be pushed back indefinitely due to the recommendation made by the CDC to restrict events of more than 50 people for eight weeks. On June 23, commissioner Rob Manfred unilaterally implemented a 60-game season. Players reported to training camps on July 1 in order to resume spring training and prepare for a July 24 Opening Day. The 2020 Major League Baseball season saw the adoption of many temporary rules, including universal DH, 7-inning scheduled doubleheaders, and extra innings starting with a runner on second. All affiliated minor league seasons were canceled, leaving top prospects and depth players at the team's alternate training site in Tacoma on an expanded roster.

Standings

American League West

American League Wild Card

Record against opponents

Game log

Regular season

|- style="background:#fbb;"
| 1 || July 24 || @ Astros || 2–8 || Verlander (1–0) || Gonzales (0–1) || — || 0–1 || L1
|- style="background:#fbb;"
| 2 || July 25 || @ Astros || 2–7 || McCullers Jr. (1–0) || Walker (0–1) || — || 0–2 || L2
|- style="background:#bfb;"
| 3 || July 26 || @ Astros || 7–6 || Altavilla (1–0) || Devenski (0–1) || Williams (1) || 1–2 || W1
|- style="background:#fbb;"
| 4 || July 27 || @ Astros || 5–8 || Bielak (1–0) || Graveman (0–1) || Osuna (1) || 1–3 || L1
|- style="background:#fbb;"
| 5 || July 28 || @ Angels || 2–10 || Buchter (1–0) || Sheffield (0–1) || — || 1–4 || L2
|- style="background:#bfb;"
| 6 || July 29 || @ Angels || 10–7 || Shaw (1–0) || Barnes (0–1) || Altavilla (1) || 2–4 || W1
|- style="background:#bfb;"
| 7 || July 30 || @ Angels || 8–5 || Gonzales (1–1) || Bundy (1–1) || — || 3–4 || W2
|- style="background:#bfb;"
| 8 || July 31 || Athletics || 5–3 || Walker (1–1) || Manaea (0–2) || Williams (2) || 4–4 || W3
|-

|- style="background:#fbb;"
| 9 || August 1 || Athletics || 2–3 (10) || Soria (1–0) || Altavilla (1–1) || Hendriks (2) || 4–5 || L1
|- style="background:#fbb;"
| 10 || August 2 || Athletics || 2–3 || Bassitt (1–0) || Graveman (0–2) || Hendriks (3) || 4–6 || L2
|- style="background:#fbb;"
| 11 || August 3 || Athletics || 1–11 || Montas (1–1) || Sheffield (0–2) || — || 4–7 || L3
|- style="background:#fbb;"
| 12 || August 4 || Angels || 3–5 || Heaney (1–0) || Dunn (0–1) || Buttrey (1) || 4–8 || L4
|- style="background:#bfb;"
| 13 || August 5 || Angels || 7–6 || Gonzales (2–1) || Teherán (0–1) || Edwards Jr. (1) || 5–8 || W1
|- style="background:#fbb;"
| 14 || August 6 || Angels || 1–6 || Bundy (2–1) || Walker (1–2) || — || 5–9 || L1
|- style="background:#fbb;"
| 15 || August 7 || Rockies || 4–8 || Senzatela (3–0) || Kikuchi (0–1) || — || 5–10 || L2
|- style="background:#fbb;"
| 16 || August 8 || Rockies || 0–5 || Hoffman (2–0) || Misiewicz (0–1) || — || 5–11 || L3
|- style="background:#bfb;"
| 17 || August 9 || Rockies || 5–3 || Sheffield (1–2) || Márquez (2–2) || Williams (3) || 6–11 || W1
|- style="background:#bfb;"
| 18 || August 10 || @ Rangers || 10–2 || Dunn (1–1) || Gibson (0–2) || — || 7–11 || W2
|- style="background:#fbb;"
| 19 || August 11 || @ Rangers || 2–4 || Vólquez (2–1) || Gonzales (2–2) || Montero (3) || 7–12 || L1
|- style="background:#fbb;"
| 20 || August 12 || @ Rangers || 4–7 || Hernández (3–0) || Swanson (0–1) || Montero (4) || 7–13 || L2
|- style="background:#fbb;"
| 21 || August 14 || @ Astros || 1–11 || Valdez (1–2) || Cortes Jr. (0–1) || — || 7–14 || L3
|- style="background:#fbb;"
| 22 || August 15 || @ Astros || 1–2 || Javier (2–1) || Margevicius (0–1) || Pressly (2) || 7–15 || L4
|- style="background:#fbb;"
| 23 || August 16 || @ Astros || 2–3 || Pressly (1–1) || Swanson (0–2) || — || 7–16 || L5
|- style="background:#fbb;"
| 24 || August 17 || @ Dodgers || 9–11 || Ferguson (1–0) || Magill (0–1) || Jansen (7) || 7–17 || L6
|- style="background:#fbb;"
| 25 || August 18 || @ Dodgers || 1–2 || Treinen (2–1) || Altavilla (1–2) || — || 7–18 || L7
|- style="background:#bfb;"
| 26 || August 19 || Dodgers || 6–4 || Walker (2–2) || Santana (1–1) || Williams (4) || 8–18 || W1
|- style="background:#fbb;"
| 27 || August 20 || Dodgers || 1–6 || Kershaw (3–1) || Kikuchi (0–2) || — || 8–19 || L1
|- style="background:#bfb;"
| 28 || August 21 || Rangers || 7–4 || Margevicius (1–1) || Allard (0–2) || Williams (5) || 9–19 || W1
|- style="background:#bfb;"
| 29 || August 22 || Rangers || 10–1 || Sheffield (2–2) || Lyles (1–3) || — || 10–19 || W2
|- style="background:#bfb;"
| 30 || August 23 || Rangers || 4–1 || Dunn (2–1) || Minor (0–5) || Williams (6) || 11–19 || W3
|- style="background:#bfb;"
| 31 || August 25 || @ Padres || 8–3 || Gonzales (3–2) || Paddack (2–3) || — || 12–19 || W4
|- style="background:#bbb;"
| — || August 26 || @ Padres || colspan=7 | Postponed (strikes due to shooting of Jacob Blake); Makeup: August 27 
|- style="background:#fbb;"
| 32 || August 27 || @ Padres  || 7–10  || Johnson (3–1) || Williams (0–1) || — || 12–20 || L1
|- style="background:#bfb;"
| 33 || August 27 || @ Padres  || 8–3  || Kikuchi (1–2) || Richards (1–2) || — || 13–20 || W1
|- style="background:#fbb;"
| 34 || August 28 || @ Angels || 2–3 || Heaney (2–2) || Margevicius (1–2) || Buttrey (4) || 13–21 || L1
|- style="background:#fbb;"
| 35 || August 29 || @ Angels || 3–16 || Bundy (4–2) || Sheffield (2–3) || — || 13–22 || L2
|- style="background:#bfb;"
| 36 || August 30 || @ Angels || 2–1  || Williams (1–1) || Quijada (0–1) || Ramírez (1) || 14–22 || W1
|- style="background:#bfb;"
| 37 || August 31 || @ Angels || 2–1 || Gonzales (4–2) || Andriese (1–2) || — || 15–22 || W2
|-

|- style="background:#bbb;"
| — || September 1 || Athletics || colspan=7 | Postponed (COVID-19); Makeup: September 14
|- style="background:#bbb;"
| — || September 2 || Athletics || colspan=7 | Postponed (COVID-19); Makeup: September 14
|- style="background:#bbb;"
| — || September 3 || Athletics || colspan=7 | Postponed (COVID-19); Makeup: September 26
|- style="background:#bfb;"
| 38 || September 4 || Rangers || 6–3 || Kikuchi (2–2) || Cody (0–1) || — || 16–22 || W3
|- style="background:#bfb;"
| 39 || September 5 || Rangers || 5–3 || Gerber (1–0) || Hernández (5–1) || Ramírez (2) || 17–22 || W4
|- style="background:#bfb;"
| 40 || September 6 || Rangers || 4–3 || Dunn (3–1) || Lyles (1–4) || Hirano (1) || 18–22 || W5
|- style="background:#bfb;"
| 41 || September 7 || Rangers || 8–4 || Gonzales (5–2) || Allard (0–5) || Ramírez (3) || 19–22 || W6
|- style="background:#fbb;"
| 42 || September 8 || @ Giants || 5–6 || Rogers (2–3) || Misiewicz (0–2) || Watson (2) || 19–23 || L1
|- style="background:#fbb;"
| 43 || September 9 || @ Giants || 1–10 || Anderson (2–3) || Margevicius (1–3) || — || 19–24 || L2
|- style="background:#fbb;"
| 44 || September 11 || @ Diamondbacks || 3–4 || Young (2–3) || Kikuchi (2–3) || Crichton (1) || 19–25 || L3
|- style="background:#bfb;"
| 45 || September 12 || @ Diamondbacks || 7–3 || Sheffield (3–3) || Gallen (1–2) || — || 20–25 || W1
|- style="background:#bfb;"
| 46 || September 13 || @ Diamondbacks || 7–3 || Sadler (1–0) || Weaver (1–7) || — || 21–25 || W2
|- style="background:#bfb;"
| 47 || September 14  || Athletics || 6–5  || Gonzales (6–2) || Soria (2–2) || Hirano (2) || 22–25 || W3
|- style="background:#fbb;"
| 48 || September 14  || Athletics || 0–9  || Minor (1–5) || Yacabonis (0–1) || — || 22–26 || L1
|- style="background:#bbb;"
| — || September 15 || Giants || colspan=7 | Postponed (Bad Air Quality); Makeup: September 17
|- style="background:#fbb;"
| 49 ||  || Giants || 3–9 || Cahill (1–1) || Newsome (0–1) || — || 22–27 || L2
|- style="background:#fbb;"
| 50 ||  || Giants || 4–6 || Garcia (1–1) || Graveman (0–3) || Selman (1) || 22–28 || L3
|- style="background:#fbb;"
| 51 ||  || Padres || 1–6 || Paddack (4–4) || Kikuchi (2–4) || — || 22–29 || L4
|- style="background:#bfb;"
| 52 ||  || Padres || 4–1 || Sheffield (4–3) || Altavilla (1–3) || Hirano (3) || 23–29 || W1
|- style="background:#fbb;"
| 53 || || Padres || 4–7  || Rosenthal (1–0) || Sadler (1–1) || — || 23–30 || L1
|- style="background:#bfb;"
| 54 || September 21 || Astros || 6–1 || Gonzales (7–2) || McCullers Jr. (3–3) || — || 24–30 || W1
|- style="background:#fbb;"
| 55 || September 22 || Astros || 1–6 || Valdez (5–3) || Sadler (1–2) || — || 24–31 || L1
|- style="background:#bfb;"
| 56 || September 23 || Astros || 3–2 || Margevicius (2–3) || Greinke (3–3) || Hirano (4) || 25–31 || W1
|- style="background:#fbb;"
| 57 || September 25 || @ Athletics || 1–3  || Diekman (2–0) || Gerber (1–1) || — || 25–32 || L1
|- style="background:#bfb;"
| 58 || September 26  || @ Athletics || 5–1  || Graveman (1–3) || Hendriks (3–1) || — || 26–32 || W1
|- style="background:#bfb;"
| 59 || September 26  || Athletics || 12–3  || Dunn (4–1) || Blackburn (0–1) || — || 27–32 || W2
|- style="background:#fbb;"
| 60 || September 27 || @ Athletics || 2–6 || Petit (2–1) || Hirano (0–1) || — || 27–33 || L1
|-

|- style="text-align:center;"
| Legend:       = Win       = Loss       = PostponementBold = Mariners team member

Roster

Statistics

Batting 
Note: G = Games played; AB = At bats; R = Runs; H = Hits; 2B = Doubles; 3B = Triples; HR = Home runs; RBI = Runs batted in; SB = Stolen bases; BB = Walks; K = Strikeouts; AVG = Batting average; OBP = On base percentage; SLG = Slugging percentage;

Source

Pitching 
Note: W = Wins; L = Losses; ERA = Earned run average; G = Games pitched; GS = Games started; SV = Saves; IP = Innings pitched; H = Hits allowed; R = Runs allowed; ER = Earned runs allowed; BB = Walks allowed; K = Strikeouts

Source

Farm system

References

External links
Seattle Mariners Official Site  (Seattle Mariners Schedule) 
2020 Seattle Mariners season at Baseball Reference

Seattle Mariners seasons
Seattle Mariners season
Seattle Mariners
Seattle Mariners